Ma was a local goddess at Comana in Cappadocia. Her name Ma means "Mother", and she also had the epithets "Invincible" and "Bringer of Victory".

History
Ma has been interpreted as a mother goddess, but at the same time as a warrior goddess, as her name and epithets indicate both.

She was associated with the transition of adulthood of both genders, and sacred prostitution was practiced during her biennial festivals.

Ma was also seen as a moon goddess, being associated with the Anatolia moon god Mēn, with a temple estate dedicated to Mēn Pharnakou and Selene at Ameria, near Cabira, in the Kingdom of Pontus, being an attempt to counter-balance the influence of the Moon goddess Ma of Comana.

Ma has been identified with a number of other deities, indicating her function. She has been compared to Cybele and Bellona. The ancient Greeks compared Ma to the goddess Enyo and Athena Nicephorus. Plutarch likened her with Semele and Athena.  Ma was introduced and worshiped in Macedonia together with other foreign deities.

Ma-Enyo, a fusion between the Anatolian goddess Ma and the Greek Goddess, Enyo, was considered the great west Asian nature-goddess, with Comana's temple and its fame in ancient times as the place where the rites of this, a variety of the nature goddess, were celebrated with much solemnity.

Cult
Ma is described as a local Anatolian goddess, with her cult centered around her temple at Komana in Cappadocia. Her temple in Comana is described at length by Strabo (XI, 521; XII, 535, 537).

See also
Mah
Men (deity)

Notes

References
Yulia Ustinova, The Supreme Gods of the Bosporan Kingdom: Celestial Aphrodite and the Most High God (1999), p. 138.
Robin Lane Fox, Pagans and Christians (1988),  p. 536.
George Perrot, 'History of Art in Phrygia, Lydia, Caria and Lycia'' (2007), p. 30.

Ancient Cappadocia
Ancient Anatolia
Phrygian goddesses
Cybele
War goddesses
Mother goddesses